Phillip Stewart Diehl (born July 16, 1994) is an American professional baseball pitcher in the Cleveland Guardians organization. He previously played in Major League Baseball (MLB) for the Colorado Rockies and Cincinnati Reds.

Amateur career
Diehl attended Moeller High School in Cincinnati, Ohio. In 2013, he enrolled at the University of Evansville and played college baseball for the Evansville Purple Aces. Diehl transferred to Wabash Valley College in Mount Carmel, Illinois, in 2014. He then transferred to Louisiana Tech University and played college baseball for the Louisiana Tech Bulldogs in 2015 and 2016. He missed the majority of the 2015 season with an arm injury.

Professional career

New York Yankees
The New York Yankees selected Diehl in the 27th round of the 2016 MLB draft. He signed with the Yankees for $50,000 rather than return to college, and was assigned to the Staten Island Yankees of the Class A-Short Season New York-Penn League. He began the 2018 season with the Tampa Tarpons of the Class A-Advanced Florida State League and was promoted to the Trenton Thunder of the Class AA Eastern League.

Colorado Rockies
On March 23, 2019, the Yankees traded Diehl to the Colorado Rockies in exchange for outfielder Mike Tauchman. After the trade, he played for the Hartford Yard Goats, and the Albuquerque Isotopes.

On June 10, 2019, his contract was selected and he was called up to the major leagues for the first time. He made his debut on June 11 versus the Chicago Cubs, allowing two runs in one inning of relief. On June 23, 2020, it was announced that Diehl had tested positive for COVID-19. He returned in time for the start of summer camp on July 4. In 2020, Diehl pitched six innings in as many games, allowing seven runs on seven hits for a 10.50 ERA with four strikeouts.

On April 10, 2021, Diehl was designated for assignment after Alan Trejo was added to the roster.

Cincinnati Reds
On April 14, 2021, Diehl was claimed off waivers by the Cincinnati Reds. On May 2, 2021, Diehl was designated for assignment by Cincinnati following the waiver claim of Ashton Goudeau. On May 4, Diehl was outrighted to the Triple-A Louisville Bats.

Diehl was assigned to Triple-A Louisville to begin the 2022 season. He recorded a 4.50 ERA and 0.75 WHIP in eight innings of work across eight relief appearances before he had his contract selected to Cincinnati's active roster on April 27, 2022. On May 9, Diehl was designated for assignment by Cincinnati. On May 12, he cleared waivers and was sent outright to Triple-A Louisville.

New York Mets
On July 28, 2022, the Reds traded Diehl and Tyler Naquin to the New York Mets for minor league prospects Jose Acuña and Hector Rodríguez. Diehl made 13 appearances for the Triple-A Syracuse Mets to close out the year, but struggled to an 0–2 record and 8.27 ERA with nine strikeouts in  innings pitched. He elected free agency on October 15, 2022.

Cleveland Guardians
On February 7, 2023, Diehl signed a minor league contract with the Cleveland Guardians organization.

References

External links

1994 births
Living people
Albuquerque Isotopes players
Baseball players from Cincinnati
Charleston RiverDogs players
Cincinnati Reds players
Colorado Rockies players
Evansville Purple Aces baseball players
Hartford Yard Goats players
Louisville Bats players
Louisiana Tech Bulldogs baseball players
Major League Baseball pitchers
Pulaski Yankees players
Staten Island Yankees players
Tampa Tarpons players
Trenton Thunder players
Wabash Valley Warriors baseball players